Deer Prairie Creek Preserve is a  natural area with  of trail in unincorporated Sarasota County, Florida, USA, around  along the Myakka River.

History
The land was acquired between 2000 and 2004 through a partnership between Sarasota County’s Environmentally Sensitive Lands Protection Program (ESLPP) and the Southwest Florida Water Management District (SWFWMD).

Environment
Habitats include pine flatwoods, prairie hammock and seasonal wetlands. Animals living in the area include gopher tortoises, deer, alligators, river otter, wild turkey, swallow-tailed kite, Florida scrub-jays and wading birds. Notable plants growing in the preserve are St John's wort, tarflower and the pine lily (Lilium catesbaei), native to Florida. Equestrian uses are also allowed.

The park has two entrances. The northern entrance is located at 7001 Forbes Trail and the southern entrance at 10201 South Tamiami Trail.

The park has over 70 miles of Hiking Trails. There are also Bicycle Trails.

References

External links
Deer Prairie Creek Preserve Management Plan

Protected areas of Sarasota County, Florida
Southwest Florida Water Management District reserves